Franklyn (Frank) Witter (born 14 June 1959) is a Jamaican politician from the Labour Party. He was appointed Minister of State in the Ministry of Agriculture & Fisheries on 11 January 2022.

External links 

 Witter on Facebook

References 

1959 births
Living people
People from Saint Elizabeth Parish

21st-century Jamaican politicians
Government ministers of Jamaica
Members of the House of Representatives of Jamaica
Jamaica Labour Party politicians
Members of the 13th Parliament of Jamaica
Members of the 14th Parliament of Jamaica